Nur ad-Din Abu al-Hasan Ali ibn Sultan Muhammad al-Hirawi al-Qari (d. 1605/1606), known as Mulla Ali al-Qari was an Islamic scholar.

He was born in Herat, where he received his basic Islamic education. Thereafter, he travelled to Mecca and studied under the scholar Shaykh Ahmad Ibn Hajar al-Haytami Makki, and al-Qari eventually decided to remain in Mecca where he taught, died and was buried.

He is considered in Hanafi circles  to be one of the masters of hadith and imams of fiqh, Qur'anic commentary, language, history and tasawwuf. He was a hafiz (memoriser of the Quran) and a famous calligrapher who wrote a Quran by hand every year.

Al-Qari wrote several books, including the commentary al-Mirqat on Mishkat al-Masabih in several volumes, a two-volume commentary on Qadi Ayyad's Ash-Shifa, a commentary on the Shama'il al-Tirmidhi, and a two-volume commentary on Al-Ghazali's abridgement of the Ihya Ulum ad-Din (The Revival of the Religious Sciences) entitled `Ayn al-`Ilm wa Zayn al-Hilm (The spring of knowledge and the adornment of understanding). He also wrote Daw' al-Ma'ali Sharh Bad' al-Amali, an exposition of Qasida Bad' al-Amali by Siraj al-Din al-Ushi. 

His most popular work is a collection of prayers (dua), taken from the Quran and the Hadith, called Hizb ul-Azam. The collection is divided into seven chapters, giving one chapter for each day of the week. This work is sometimes found in a collection with the Dalail al-Khayrat.

He died in Makkah and was buried in Jannat al-Mu'alla Cemetery graveyard.

See also
 List of Hanafis
 List of Muslim theologians
 List of Ash'aris and Maturidis
 List of Islamic scholars

References

Hanafis
Maturidis
16th-century Muslim theologians
Hadith scholars
Sunni imams
Sunni fiqh scholars
Sunni Sufis
People from Herat
1605 deaths
Year of birth unknown
17th-century Muslim theologians
Burials at Jannat al-Mu'alla
Critics of Ibn Arabi